Medieval Lords is a video game released in 2004 by the French company Monte Cristo Multimedia.

It plays like a medieval version of SimCity being like a city building game where the violence and battles take a back seat to village management like providing food, entertainment, religious amenities and transit to your peasants so you can collect taxes on them.

One of the uncommon features in the game is that you can enter a first person view and walk around your own town as if you were a villager.

References

External links 

2004 video games
City-building games
Video games set in the Middle Ages
Video games developed in France
Windows games
Windows-only games